On 28 December 2022, a fire at a casino hotel in Poipet, Cambodia, killed at least 27 people.

Background
Under Cambodian law gambling is prohibited for citizens, but is allowed for foreigners. Because most types of gambling are also illegal in Thailand, Poipet is popular with Thai gamblers. The Grand Diamond City is a casino hotel which backs onto the Thai border. The business employs 400 staff. The casino was owned by fugitive Thai politician Vatana Asavahame, aged 86 at the time of the fire, who was sentenced in absentia to three years in jail for land-procurement fraud.

Fire
At 23:30 on 28 December 2022, a fire broke out in the Grand Diamond City when hundreds of people were in the building. At least 27 people were killed (most of them as a result of smoke inhalation or falling) and 112 others were injured. Seventeen of the dead were Thai nationals, and one each were Nepalese, Malaysian, and Chinese. At least 27 of the injured were treated in hospitals.

References

Man-made disasters in Cambodia
Building and structure fires in Asia
2022 in Cambodia
December 2022 events in Asia
2022 fires in Asia
Hotel fires
Banteay Meanchey province